Daqing (alternately romanized as Taching) is a prefecture-level city in the west of Heilongjiang province, People's Republic of China. The name literally means "Great Celebration". Daqing is known as the "Oil Capital of China" and has experienced a phenomenal boom since oil was discovered at the Daqing Oil Field in 1959.

Its population was 2,781,562 as of the 2020 census, of whom 1,574,389 lived in the built-up (or metro) area in four out of the total of five urban districts: Sartu, Longfeng, Ranghulu and Honggang.

History
The region now known as Daqing Prefecture was a reasonably insignificant place until the Qing dynasty, known only as an unsettled hunting ground of Dörbet Oirat tribes due to its wetland and prairies. The region began to grow slightly after the Russian Empire constructed the Chinese Eastern Railway (KVZhD) through the area in 1898. The railway has a station at Sartu in today's Sartu District. It was not until 1959 that oil was discovered in the region as part of the large scale oil exploration put into motion across the Northeast China Plain. 
The Daqing oilfield was discovered in the late 1950s, and drilling began in 1958. A town with the same name was founded in 1959 to house workers extracting oil and gas from the Daqing oilfield and to host industries which could take advantage of the energy and petrochemicals, shortly before the 10th anniversary of the founding of the PRC. The name Daqing literally means "Great Celebration". On 26 May 1960, Anda City was established at former Anda town (today's Anda City in Suihua prefecture), administering Daqing oilfield area. Five months later, the administrative organs of the oilfield relocated in Sartu. On 23 June 1964, the city was established Anda special administrative region, with Anda county administering its surrounding area. On 14 December 1979, the city was separated from Anda and was renamed Daqing after the oilfield.

Since its foundation it has been advocated as a model of good practice in industry and healthcare by the Chinese government.

Learn from Daqing in industry
The fact that Mao Zedong promulgated his Supreme Directive, Learn from Daqing in industry|In industry, learn from Daqing, in the 1960s reflects how important a role Daqing has historically played in industry in China. Learn from Daqing in industry was a slogan during the Cultural Revolution telling the people to use the city as an example for industrial production.

The film Entrepreneurial Pioneers, made in the early 1970s, is a literary rendition of the history of Daqing. During the Mao era, Daqing's agricultural counterpart was Dazhai, a village in the hilly Xiyang county, Shanxi Province, for which Chairman Mao issued the directive In agriculture, learn from Dazhai, also in the 1960s.

Administrative divisions
Daqing is divided into 9 county-level divisions: 5 districts, 3 counties and 1 autonomous county.

Climate
Located in the north temperate zone, Daqing has a humid continental climate (Köppen Dwa) and is affected by the Siberian high and the East Asian monsoon. Generally, winter is bitterly cold with occasional snowfalls, and spring and autumn are prevailed by monsoons. The vast majority of the annual rainfall occurs during summer. The diurnal temperature variation can be up to  during the growing period. A majority of the annual precipitation falls in July and August alone. With monthly percent possible sunshine ranging from 53% in July to 70% in February, the city receives 2,726 hours of bright sunshine annually.

Demographics
Daqing has a population of 2.9 million, of them mainly Han Chinese, with a few population of other 31 minority ethnic groups including Manchu, Mongolian, Korean, and Hui nationalities. The population density is 112.69/km², urban population density 205.07/km².

Economy

Daqing's economy highly depends on petroleum and related industries. Daqing's oilfield is China's largest and the world's fourth most productive. Petroleum accounts for 60.8% of GDP. In 2011, Daqing's gross domestic product (GDP) was RMB374 billion yuan, representing a rise of 12.1% year on year. Primary industries output (including agriculture, forestry, animal husbandry and the fisheries) increased by 13.5% to RMB13.29 billion. Secondary and value-added industries and construction output experienced an increase of 10.1%, reaching RMB307 billion, while the tertiary industry output increased 22.9% to RMB53.74 billion. In 2015 Daqing had a GDP of RMB 298.35 billion.

Foreign trade
Daqing exports over 10 million tons of crude oil each year. Over 160 varieties of paraffin wax, ethylene, tar oil and benzene are exported to more than 10 nations and regions including the US, the UK, Thailand and Hong Kong.

In 2011, total import and export volume in Daqing reached US$2.16 billion, up by 40.1%. Export volume was US$550 million and import volume was US$1.61 billion. Daqing's main exports include six categories of petrochemical products, construction materials, processed foodstuffs, office furniture and mechanical and electronic equipment.

Banking and insurance
There were 32 banking institutions in Daqing by the end of 2006; none were foreign-invested banks. In 2011, savings deposits in Renminbi and foreign exchange totaled 170.5 billion RMB. The local finance sector plays an important role in building up Daqing's Century Oilfield and in developing new industries.

The Industrial and Commercial Bank of China, China Agricultural Bank, China Construction Bank, Bank of China, China Communications Bank, the Everbright Bank, Guangdong Development Bank, the Daqing Urban Commercial Bank, Daqing Rural Credit Cooperative Union and the County Urban Credit Cooperative are the major banks serving Daqing.

Transportation

Railway
Daqing is a major railway hub in western Heilongjiang province and is located on the junction of Harbin-Manzhouli Railway and Tongliao-Ranghulu Railway. Daqing has three major railway stations: Daqing station, Daqing West station (formerly Ranghulu railway station) and Daqing East station. Trains from Daqing connect the city with Beijing, Harbin, Dalian and several other cities in China. The newly built Harbin–Qiqihar Intercity Railway has stops at both Daqing West station and Daqing East station.

Airport

Daqing Sartu Airport was opened on 1 September 2009. There are flights to several large cities including Beijing, Chengdu, Guangzhou, Hangzhou, Qingdao and Shanghai.

Highway
Daqing is linked to the national highway network through the G45 Daqing–Guangzhou Expressway and G10 Suifenhe-Manzhouli Expressway.

Culture

Daqing spirit
Generated by the history of the city, Daqing has a culture centering around the Iron man spirit. It consists of patriotism, truth-seeking, entrepreneurial spirit and dedication. Wang Jinxi (known as "Iron Man" Wang), a petroleum worker on the Daqing Oilfield who led No. 1205 drilling team, was honored as a national hero due to his contributions to the petroleum industry of China. Daqing was established by the central government as a model for the secondary industry during the 1960s. In order to illuminate the entrepreneurial history of Daqing and its people, several films were made by companies in China.

Sports

The most popular sport in Daqing is association football. The largest sports venue by capacity is the 32,000-capacity Daqing Olympic Park Stadium.

Sister Cities

Domestic
Dongying, Jinan
Karamay, Xinjiang

International
 East London, Eastern Cape, South Africa
 Calgary, Alberta, Canada
 Tyumen, Tyumen Oblast, Russia
 Chungju, North Chungcheong, South Korea

See also
List of twin towns and sister cities in China

References

External links

Daqing Government Website 

 
Cities in Heilongjiang
Prefecture-level divisions of Heilongjiang